Chilcaymarca District is one of fourteen districts of the province Castilla in Peru.

See also 
 Puka Mawras

References

Districts of the Castilla Province
Districts of the Arequipa Region